Peter James Reynolds is a theoretical physicist serving as a senior research scientist (ST) at the Army Research Office (ARO). He was formerly the ARO Physics Division chief and a program manager for atomic and molecular physics.  Prior to joining ARO in 2003 he was at the Office of Naval Research, serving as a program officer, starting in 1988.

He was awarded the status of Fellow in the American Physical Society, after he was nominated by the Division of Computational Physics in 1995 for his pioneering work on combining the renormalization group method with Monte Carlo simulations in the study of statistical problems, for his contributions to quantum Monte Carlo (QMC) simulations, and for his service to the physics community through his activities as a Program Officer at the Office of Naval Research.

His QMC work was done while at the Lawrence Berkeley Laboratory (LBL) from 1980 to 1988, initially working there as part of the National Resource for Computation in Chemistry (NRCC). His renormalization group work focused on geometric phase transitions such as percolation and their connection to disordered lattice spin models. That work was done as part of his PhD work at MIT and as an assistant research professor at Boston University (BU).

References 

Fellows of the American Physical Society
American physicists
Living people
1949 births